The Honey Dreamers was a singing group composed of 3 males and two females that appeared on radio and early television programs like CBS's Faye Emerson's Wonderful Town and The Ed Sullivan Show. The group was formed at St. Olaf College in 1946 by Keith Textor and his roommate Dick Larson, who introduced Keith to Sylvia Mikelson. Textor led the group and was responsible for the group's intricate harmonies Their manager, at one point, was Art Ward.

Personnel 
Singers in the original lineup
 Keith Textor
 Sylvia Mikelson (later known as Sylvia Textor)
 Dick Larson
 Ardys Benson
 Paul Montan

Later lineups included 
 Bob Davis
 Marion Bye
 Bob Mitchell
 Patty McGovern (formerly married to Leigh Kamman)
 Lew Anderson

Manager
 Art Ward

Discography 
Singles
"Along the Navajo Trail"
"And That Reminds Me" ( with Della Reese )
"The Best Things in Life Are Free" 	
"Can Anyone Explain? (No! No! No!)" 	  
"Down the Old Ox Road"
"Give an Ordinary Fellow a Break"
"Learnin' The Blues" (with Charlie Spivak) 
"Potato Bug Boogie"
"Roll Along the Prairie Moon"N
"Rootie Tootie Tootie" (The Kewtee Bear Song) 	    
"A Smile WIll Go A Long Long Way"
"Something's Gotta Give" (with Charlie Spivak) 
"Sandy, The Soundman" (Sound effects by Bob Prescott)
Album 
An Evening with the Honeydreamers (LP)
Track Listing 
 Really Livin' 
 Back in Your Own Backyard 
 I've Got Sixpence 
 On the Sunny Side of the Street 
 It's a Good Day 
 Wrap Your Troubles in Dreams 
 True Kind O' Thinking 
 Just Around the Corner 
 When You're Smiling 
 Blue Skies 
 Feeling So Good Today 
 Best Things in Life Are Free

A Child's Introduction to Jazz (with Bob Keeshan) (1958)

References 

<https://www.discogs.com/artist/1400458-The-Honeydreamers/>

External links 
 
 The Vitacoustic Label 	   

American pop music groups
RCA Victor artists
People from Minnesota